Polypedates iskandari is a species of frogs in the family Rhacophoridae. It is endemic to Sulawesi, Indonesia.

References

 Riyanto, Mumpuni & McGuire, 2011 : Morphometry of striped tree frogs, Polypedates leucomystax (Gravenhorst, 1829) from Indonesia with description of a new species. Russian Journal of Herpetology, no. 1,  (original text).
http://research.amnh.org/vz/herpetology/amphibia/Amphibia/Anura/Rhacophoridae/Rhacophorinae/Polypedates/Polypedates-iskandari

iskandari
Amphibians of Indonesia
Frogs of Asia
Amphibians described in 2011